Stoneham-et-Tewkesbury is a united township municipality in the Canadian province of Quebec, located in the regional county municipality of La Jacques-Cartier north of Quebec City. Its main attraction is the Stoneham Mountain Resort.

The large territory of the municipality is only developed and inhabited in the south, where the population centres of Saint-Adolphe, Stoneham, and Tewkesbury are located. Large portions of the north are included in the Jacques-Cartier National Park and the Laurentides Wildlife Reserve. The terrain is hilly, part of the Laurentian Mountains, and crossed by the Jacques-Cartier, upper Sainte-Anne, and Hurons Rivers. Some of the more notable lakes are Beaumont, Saint-Vincent, and Saint-Guillaume.

History
That same year, the toponyms of the geographic townships of Stoneham and Tewkesbury appeared. Tewkesbury may be attributed to Kenelm Chandler who was born in Tewkesbury, England, arrived in 1764 and was granted 9713 hectares of land in Stoneham in 1800.

The first influx of Irish, English, and Scottish settlers came in 1815. By 1831, its population had passed 175. In 1845, the Stoneham Municipality was formed and abolished in 1847. In 1850, the Parish of Saint-Edmond-de-Stoneham was formed, named after Edmund Rich of Canterbury (1170-1240). The Stoneham Post Office opened in 1854. A year later on July 1, the United Township Municipality of Stoneham-et-Tewkesbury was established, populated by about 25 families.

In 1871, its population had grown to 640 (360 in Stoneham township and 280 in Tewkesbury township). In 1880, the Tewkesbury Post Office opened (and closed in 1963). The completion of the railroad, owned by the St. Charles and Huron River Railway Company, between Stoneham-et-Tewkesbury and Loretteville in 1912 led to intensive logging in the area. Timber was floated down the Hurons River to Stoneham from where it was brought by rail to Quebec City. The railway was also used to transport cargo and wood pulp of the Brown Corporation and the Donnacona Paper Company. By 1920, the place had become an important commercial center of northern Quebec.

In 1973, the neighbouring municipality of Saint-Adolphe was annexed into Stoneham-et-Tewkesbury, making it one of the largest municipalities in Quebec at that time.

Demographics 

Private dwellings occupied by usual residents: 3,862 (total dwellings: 4,421)

Mother tongue:
 English as first language: 1.7%
 French as first language: 95.5%
 English and French as first language: 1.3%
 Other as first language: 1.1%

Local government

Stoneham-et-Tewkesbury forms part of the federal electoral district of Portneuf—Jacques-Cartier and has been represented by Joël Godin of the Conservative Party since 2015. Provincially, Stoneham-et-Tewkesbury is part of the Chauveau electoral district and is represented by Sylvain Lévesque of the Coalition Avenir Québec since 2018.

List of mayors

 Edmond Bureau, 1938-1940
 John Payne, 1940-1944
 Philppe Plamondon 1944-1947
 John Payne, 1947-1948
 Sydney McCune, 1948-1975
 Jean-Guy Vézina, 1975-1976
 Raymond Labrecque, 1976-1980
 Rodrigue Harvey, 1980-1990
 Jacques Nolin, 1990-1994
 Dany Barbeau, 1994-2005
 Gaétane G. St-Laurent, 2005-2009
 Robert Miller, 2009-

See also
List of united township municipalities in Quebec

References

External links
	
 United township municipality of Stoneham and Tewkesbury 

United township municipalities in Quebec
Incorporated places in Capitale-Nationale
Populated places established in 1815
1815 establishments in Lower Canada